Oscar Kristian Bergström (3 May 1903 – 3 January 1961) was a Swedish boxer who competed in the 1924 Summer Olympics. He was born and died in Stockholm at the age of 58. In 1924 he was eliminated in the quarter-finals of the flyweight class after losing his fight to the upcoming bronze medalist Raymond Fee.

References

External links
profile

1903 births
1961 deaths
Flyweight boxers
Olympic boxers of Sweden
Boxers at the 1924 Summer Olympics
Swedish male boxers
Sportspeople from Stockholm
20th-century Swedish people